The 1940 Princeton Tigers men's soccer team represented Princeton University during the 1940 ISFA season. The Tigers finished with an 8–0–1 record and were considered ISFA co-champions along with Penn State. It was the 72nd season of a soccer club represented by the university playing.

Schedule 

|-
!colspan=6 style="background:#FF6F00; color:#000000;"| Regular season
|-

|-

|-

|-

|-

References

Princeton
Princeton Tigers men's soccer seasons
Intercollegiate Soccer Football Association Championship-winning seasons
Princeton Tigers men's soccer
Princeton Tigers